G. E. Wilson  was an American politician who served as a member of the Oklahoma Senate between 1914 and 1918. He was the only Socialist Party member to win election to the Oklahoma Senate.

Oklahoma Senate
Wilson ran for the Oklahoma Senate in 1914.
He won the general election running as a candidate for the Socialist Party.
He was the only Socialist Party member to win election to the Oklahoma Senate.

References

20th-century American politicians
Socialist Party of America Oklahoma state senators
Year of birth missing
Year of death missing